Margareta is a female given name mainly used by Germans, Austrians, Romanians and Swedes and others. It may refer to:

People
Margareta (missionary) (c. 1369–c. 1425), Swedish missionary
Margareta of Romania (born 1949), Crown-Princess of Romania
Maya Ackerman, Russian-American computer scientist
Margareta Alströmer (1763–1816), Swedish artist
Margareta Andersson (born 1948), Swedish politician
Margareta Bengtson (born 1966), Swedish soprano
Margareta Brahe (1603–1669), Swedish lady-in-waiting 
Margareta Capsia (1682–1759), Finnish artist 
Margareta Cederfelt (born 19459, Swedish politician
Margareta Cederschiöld, Swedish tennis player
Margareta Dockvil (died after 1673), Swedish hatmaker
Margareta Kozuch (born 1986), German volleyball player

Other
, a German cargo ship in service 1984-2008
Margaretatop, a mountain in Greenland

See also 

Greta (disambiguation)
Margaret (disambiguation)
Margaretha
Margarita (disambiguation)

Romanian feminine given names
Swedish feminine given names
German feminine given names